The Grassridge Dam is an earth-fill type dam located on a tributary of the Great Fish River called the Great Brak River, near Hofmeyr, Eastern Cape, South Africa. It is the starting point for the Fish River Canoe Marathon, which ends in Cradock. The Dam was constructed in 1923 (commissioned in 1924) and has been renovated in 1948. Its main purpose is for irrigation use and the hazard potential has been ranked high (3).

See also
List of reservoirs and dams in South Africa
List of rivers of South Africa

References 

 List of South African Dams from the South African Department of Water Affairs

Dams completed in 1924
Dams in South Africa